Lesno Brdo in the Municipality of Vrhnika in Slovenia is a continuation of the settlement of Lesno Brdo in the neighbouring Municipality of Horjul. Because it belongs to a different municipality, its population and administrative statistics are always stated separately.

Lesno Brdo is best known for its red limestone quarries.

References

External links

Lesno Brdo on Geopedia

Populated places in the Municipality of Vrhnika